= Kalyadzichy =

Kalyadzichy (Belarusian: Калядзічы, Russian: Колядичи) may refer to the following places in Belarus:

- be:Калядзічы (Мінскі раён)
- be:Калядзічы (Пружанскі раён)
- be:Калядзічы (Ваўкавыскі раён)
- be:Калядзічы (станцыя)
